Yutong (officially Zhengzhou Yutong Group Co., Ltd.) is a Chinese manufacturer of commercial vehicles, especially electric buses, headquartered in Zhengzhou, Henan. Yutong also has businesses in construction machinery, real estate, and other investments. As of 2016 it was the largest bus manufacturer in the world by sales volume.

Background 
Yutong has four manufacturing bases: conventional buses, new energy buses, specialized vehicles, parts and components, and has the single largest bus manufacturing plant in the world. As of 2018, Yutong has a complete lineup of 5m-18m vehicles consisting of over 140 series of buses and coaches. In 2017, its sales volume of large and medium-sized buses reached 67,268 units. Among them 24,865 units are new energy buses. From 2005 to 2017, Yutong buses have been exported to over 30 countries and regions, including France, UK, Australia, South Africa, Cuba, Venezuela, Chile, Russia, Saudi Arabia, Taiwan (Republic of China), with a market share of over 30% in Mainland China and over 15% in the rest of the world and serving more than 210 chartered service companies and over 330 authorized service outlets.

History
Yutong's origins can be traced to the Zhengzhou Bus Repair Factory, which was established in 1963. In 1993, Zhengzhou Yutong Bus Co., Ltd. was founded with a sales volume of 708 units, and in March 1997, Yutong became the first bus company in China on the Shanghai Stock Exchange. The following year, Yutong opened its ¥400 million ($ in 1999) Yutong Industrial Park in Zhengzhou, which was the largest bus factory in Asia at the time.

By 2005, Yutong had a 22% market share of buses and coaches across China, becoming China's biggest bus manufacturer, and had won an award for being the best manufacturer in China by the World Bus Alliance. In March, Yutong launched an overseas market strategy and began exporting buses worldwide to markets such as Latin and South America, Asia-Pacific and Europe.

Yutong first entered into the electric bus market with the opening of its 'New Energy' manufacturing plant in 2012, and in 2014, opened the National Research Center on Electronic Control and Safety Engineering Technology of Electric Buses in conjunction with the Chinese government. In 2015, Yutong conducted the world's first road trials of an autonomous bus, demonstrating self-driving technology on a  drive on a highway between the cities of Zhengzhou and Kaifeng.

As of 2018, in total Yutong had exported more than 64,000 buses and coaches, with nearly 25,000 of these in 2017 being either battery electric or CNG-powered. The company's sales and service network covers six regions worldwide: Europe, the Commonwealth of Independent States, Latin America, Africa, Asia-Pacific and the Middle East. Yutong buses and coaches have been delivered to countries and regions such as France, the United Kingdom, Kazakhstan, Venezuela, Chile, Ethiopia, Cuba, South Africa, Nigeria, Singapore, the Philippines, Australia, Saudi Arabia and Bulgaria.

Yutong Bus

Zhengzhou Yutong Bus Co., Ltd. (hereinafter referred to as "Yutong Bus") is a large-scale modern manufacturing company specializing in the research and development, manufacturing and sales of bus products. Its main plant is located in the Yutong Industrial Park in Guancheng Hui District, Zhengzhou, and covers an area of 1.12 million square meters. The 'New Energy' manufacturing plant of Yutong Bus which was put into operation in 2012, covers an area of over 1.33 million square meters and has an annual production capacity of 30,000 buses and coaches.

Yutong Bus also operates a number of complete knock down manufacturing plants worldwide. A manufacturing plant in the western Venezuelan state of Yaracuy was opened in December 2015, and in collaboration with Pakistani heavy vehicle manufacturing company Master Motors, Yutong Bus opened a manufacturing plant at Port Qasim in Karachi in 2016, where buses are manufactured under the brand name Yutong-Master. Yutong Bus also plans to open a final assembly plant in Castleford in the United Kingdom, where Yutong buses and coaches are distributed in UK and Ireland through the Pelican Bus and Coach dealership.

Products

 Yutong City Master, a retro style double-decker bus based on the AEC Routemaster, built exclusively for Skopje, North Macedonia
 Yutong E10/E12 electric city bus
 Yutong CL6/ CL7 coach
 Yutong T7 minibus / limousine
 GT12/C122
Yutong TCe12/ICe12 coach - up to 50 seats, 281kWh Lithium Iron Phosphate water-cooled battery, range over 
 ZK6122HD9 coach
 ZK6108HG city bus
 ZK6118HGA city bus
 ZK6122H9 coach
 ZK6120D1 coach
 ZK6120HR 12-meter series
 ZK6122HD9/ZK6122H9 coach
 ZK6119H2 coach
 ZK6119HA coach
 ZK6752N1 coach
 ZK6115D front-engine bus
 ZK6729DX school bus
 ZK6669DX school bus
 ZK6107H coach
 ZK6105 coach
 ZK6100HB coach
 ZK6128HG articulated bus

Exports

Cuba
Yutong holds a strong presence in Cuba since entering the Cuban bus market in 2005. That May, Yutong exported 400 buses to the country, which at the time set an export record for a Chinese bus manufacturer. This record was broken in October by an order for 630 buses, then broken again in May 2007 by an export order for 5,348 buses. By 2017, Yutong had sold over 6,000 buses and coaches for service across Cuba.

In November 2017, Yutong delivered Cuba's first electric bus, a Yutong E12, which entered service in the country's capital with the Havana Transit Company.

Nordic countries

Spain
Ten Yutong ZK6140BD airside buses, equipped with six doors and capable of carrying 160 passengers, were delivered to Madrid Airport in April 2019.

United Kingdom

Yutong first entered the United Kingdom bus and coach market in 2014 through supplying diesel-powered coaches through Pelican Bus and Coach to independent coach operators.

Yutong would become a major supplier of battery electric single-deck city buses to operators across England, Scotland and Wales through the Yutong E10 and the longer E12. Both buses are in service with a number of large operators, including McGill's Bus Services, the largest operator of Yutong buses in the United Kingdom, Newport Bus, Cardiff Bus, Go North East, Stagecoach Highlands, First West Yorkshire and Centrebus in Leicester. Yutong's battery electric TCe12 coach has also sold to a small number of coach operators across the United Kingdom, with Ember Core's fleet of TCe12s being used to operate a network of intercity express services across Scotland. 

Yutong plans to expand its range of battery electric buses for UK operators in 2023, launching the E9 midibus, with the first examples due to be delivered in early 2023 to Leicester Buses. A  electric double-decker bus, based on similar buses sold in the Chinese and Singaporean markets, is also due to appear in the United Kingdom in 2023.

Saudi Arabia
Following a trial of a Yutong ZK6772BEV at the King Abdullah University of Science and Technology, a Yutong E11, Saudi Arabia's first electric city bus, was delivered for service in Jeddah as part of the Saudi Vision 2030 framework towards reducing the Kingdom's dependency on oil in March 2023.

Qatar
In preparation for the 2022 FIFA World Cup held in Qatar, 888 Yutong battery electric buses, an increase from an initial order of 741 made in 2020, were delivered to the country. Some of these buses, which operated shuttle services to and from football venues and subway stations over the course of the World Cup, were based in a  purpose-built bus depot in Lusail that was described as the world's largest, with space to store and charge 478 electric buses, as well as hosting 24 ancillary buildings on the site.

Uzbekistan

168 Yutong ZK6122H9 intercity coaches were delivered to Uzbekistan operator Uzavtoservis in 2019, with the first 100 being delivered by March and the remaining 68 delivered in April.

20 Yutong ZK6126BEVG battery electric single decker buses, as well as ten battery chargers, were delivered to Uzbekistan's capital Tashkent in February 2022, entering service with the city's bus operator Toshshakhartranskhizmat. These were followed by 40 Yutong T7 minibuses, delivered to Samarkand in April 2022 in advance of the 2022 SCO summit, which was being held in the city.

Yutong received an order for 500 CNG buses and 300 Yuwei E12 battery electric buses for operators across Uzbekistan, the largest export order for the company to date. The first batches of buses from this order began to be delivered from early 2023.

Export milestones

In total Yutong exported more than 57,000 buses and coaches. Here are some export milestones of Yutong:

 In 2009, Yutong exported 175 ZK6118HGA city buses to Kuwait.
 In 2010, Yutong signed an agreement of 202 double-decker buses with the Macedonian government in Skopje.
 In 2010, Yutong signed a 490-unit order with Ghana, following the 250-unit order signed with Ghana in 2008.
 In 2011, Yutong signed a 1,216-unit procurement contract with the Venezuelan Ministry of Transport to help them establish and complete the first BRT system in Venezuela.
 In 2012, Yutong signed an SKD order of over 100 units with Ethiopia, and in 2014, Yutong signed a CKD order of over 200 units with Ethiopia again.
In 2012, a Yutong tourist coach has  entered the Israeli market for the first time.
 In 2013, Yutong delivered 300 LNG city buses to Peru.
 In 2013, Yutong signed a 160-unit order with the Philippines.
 In 2013, Yutong delivered over 300 buses to Israel, which hit a record high in the bus import history of the country.
 In 2014, Yutong got a 1,500-unit bus order from Venezuela.
 In 2015, Yutong signed a KD contract of 2,300 buses with Venezuela. 
 In 2015, Yutong was invited to attend the 23rd annual conference of FNTV. In addition, Yutong was also involved in the “BUS 2025” program of RATP and provided a full electric bus for trial operation, which was also showcased at the UN Climate Change Conference.
 In 2016, Yutong signed the Cooperative Framework Agreement on Cuban Public Transport Improvement & Bus Capacity Enhancement Program.
 In 2016, Yutong successfully delivered 110 buses to Bulgaria.
 By the end of 2017, Yutong totally delivered more than 3,000 buses and coaches to France, UK, Israel and other countries that applied European standards.
 In 2017, 500 units of Yutong natural gas, city buses were delivered to Yangon, the capital city of Myanmar (Burma).
 In 2020, Yutong delivered 10 E12 electric Single-deck buses and 10 E12DD electric Double-decker buses to the Land Transport Authority in Singapore.

Image gallery

Autonomous buses
Yutong has their first open road trial of an autonomous bus in 2015 and have produced models in a number of sizes since. Public trials of its first generation 8-seat Xiaoyu vehicle commenced 2019 at the Boao Forum for Asia and in Zhengzhou.  Autonomous buses have also been put to use to transport workers around their large factory in Zhengzhou.

In June 2021 they claimed to have delivered 100 models of its 10-seat Xiaoyu 2.0 autonomous bus for use in Zhengzhou.  The vehicle has been delivered to Guangzhou, Nanjing, Zhengzhou, Sansha, Changsha with public trials due to commence in July 2021 in Zhengzhou.

Yutong Heavy Industries
Another core part of the Yutong Group is Yutong Heavy Industries, a manufacturer of construction equipment formed in 2003, and with about 3,500 employees and more than 120 products.

Products
Yutong YT3621 Mining Dump Truck
Yutong YT3761 Mining Dump Truck
Yutong 952A wheeled loader
Yutong 966H wheeled loader
Yutong TL210H earth mover
Yutong 988H wheeled loader
Yutong 956H wheeled loader
Yutong YTQH300 hydraulic crane
Yutong 6830 compactor
Yutong YTQH400A hydraulic crane
Yutong YTQU50 crane
Yutong WZ30-25 backhoe
Yutong WZ30-25G backhoe
Yutong WZ30-25H backhoe

Events

Yutong provided transportation services to a number of events at home and abroad including the Beijing Olympic Games, Shanghai World Expo, Belt and Road Forum, China-Africa Cooperation Forum, APEC conference, World Economic Forum, G20 Summit and other international events.

See also
List of automobile manufacturers of China
 List of buses

References

External links

Official Website 
Official Website 
Yutong Heavy Industries website 
Yutong Heavy Industries website 
Passenger Motor Vehicles Manufactures and Suppliers in China
Bus Manufacturers in China

Bus manufacturers of China
Electric bus manufacturers
Trolleybus manufacturers
Companies based in Henan
Vehicle manufacturing companies established in 1963
Construction equipment manufacturers of China
Chinese brands
Electric vehicle manufacturers of China
Chinese companies established in 1963